Lithopoma americanum is a species of sea snail, a marine gastropod mollusk in the family Turbinidae, the turban snails.

Distribution
This marine snail occurs in the Caribbean Sea, the Gulf of Mexico and off the Lesser Antilles.

Description 

The elevated, imperforate, solid shell has a trochiform shape. Its color pattern is white or yellowish. The shell contains seven whorls.  The upper three whorls are smooth in adults by erosion of the sculpture, flattened or concave on their upper surfaces, longitudinally obliquely plicate. The folds number about thirty-six on the body whorl and terminate on the periphery in nodules (or spines in the young,) generally intersected about the middle by two to four spiral impressed lines. The periphery is angled, more or less swollen. The base of the shell is nearly flat, more or less sharply radiately striate, and spirally lirate. The frequently nodulose lirae number about six, or sometimes more. The aperture is very oblique. The outer lip is usually crenulated. The short columella is heavy, bituberculate at its base, and bounded by a radiately plicate cordon.

The operculum is oval, light brown within, with a sublateral nucleus. Its outside is convex, white, granulose, more or less excavated around the upper margin, excavated near the center. Young specimens show a stout curved central rib following the spiral, its ends connected by a short straight rib.

Habitat 
Minimum recorded depth is 0 m.

References

 Gmelin, J. F. 1791. Systema naturae per regna tria naturae. Editio decima tertia. Systema Naturae, 13th ed., vol. 1(6): 3021–3910. Lipsiae
 Röding, P. F. 1798. Museum Boltenianum.  viii + 199 pp. Hamburg
 Petuch, E. J. 1994. Atlas of Florida Fossil Shells. xii + 394 pp., 100 pls. Chicago Spectrum Press: Evanston, Illinois
 Williams, S.T. (2007). Origins and diversification of Indo-West Pacific marine fauna: evolutionary history and biogeography of turban shells (Gastropoda, Turbinidae). Biological Journal of the Linnean Society, 2007, 92, 573–592

External links
 

americanum
Gastropods described in 1791
Taxa named by Johann Friedrich Gmelin